Labial commissures may refer to:

 Anterior commissure of labia majora (commissura labiorum anterior)
 Posterior commissure of labia majora (commissura labiorum posterior)
 Labial commissure of mouth (commissura labiorum oris)